The Columbia Cemetery in Columbia, Missouri has been in use as a cemetery since 1820.  The cemetery historically contains, White, African-American, and Jewish (Beth Olem Cemetery, Beth Shalom Cemetery) sections.  Located in the cemetery are a vernacular stone receiving vault (1887), and a Romanesque Revival style mausoleum (1911).

Located on Broadway just west of Downtown Columbia, the cemetery contains many burials of prominent people associated with Missouri history, the University of Missouri, or the city of Columbia. It was listed on the National Register of Historic Places in 2007. It is still an operating cemetery with room for many more burials and celebrated its 200th anniversary in 2020.

Notable interments
 Philemon Bliss – politician, Missouri Chief justice, educator
 John William "Blind" Boone – musician, pianist 
 Fred Morris Dearing – diplomat
 William Wilson Elwang – preacher and author
 Jane Froman – actress and singer
 North Todd Gentry – Missouri Attorney General, historian
 Odon Guitar – soldier
 Albert Ross Hill – politician, university president
 William Wilson Hudson – Third president of the University of Missouri
 Richard Henry Jesse – Eighth president of the University of Missouri
 John Carleton Jones – Tenth president of the University of Missouri
 John Hiram Lathrop – First president of the University of Missouri
 Frederick Middlebush – Thirteenth president of the University of Missouri
 William Lester Nelson – politician
 James S. Rollins – politician and lawyer
 Max Schwabe – politician
 James Shannon – academic
 Willard Duncan Vandiver – politician
 Edwin Moss Watson – newspaper editor
 Abraham J. Williams – Third Governor of the State of Missouri
 Walter Williams – founder of the Missouri School of Journalism and twelfth president of the University of Missouri
 Edwin William Stephens – publisher, civic leader
 William Franklin Switzler – historian, journalist

Gallery

See also
 List of cemeteries in Boone County, Missouri

References

External links

 
 
 

Cemeteries in Columbia, Missouri
Cemeteries on the National Register of Historic Places in Missouri
Romanesque Revival architecture in Missouri
Tourist attractions in Columbia, Missouri
Protected areas of Boone County, Missouri
Geography of Columbia, Missouri
Buildings and structures in Columbia, Missouri
National Register of Historic Places in Boone County, Missouri
African-American history in Columbia, Missouri
 
African-American cemeteries